Yves II le Vieux of Nesle (Ives, Ivo) (d. 1178), son of Raoul I, Seigneur of Nesle, and his wife Rainurde (Ermentrude) of Eu-Soissons.  Seigneur of Nesle, Count of Soissons. Upon the death of Renaud III, Count of Soissons, Yves was chosen as the next count by the Bishop of Soissons, Joscelin de Vierzi.

Following the preaching of Bernard of Clairvaux at Vézelay in 1146, Yves joined Louis VII and a host of French nobles in the Second Crusade.  He was part of the Crusade Concilium in Acre in June 1148 and was one of many suitors for Constance of Antioch following her husband's death in 1149.

Yves married Yolande, a daughter of Baldwin IV, Count of Hainaut, and his wife Alice of Namur. They had no children.

Upon the death of Yves, his nephew Conon became Count of Soissons.

Sources

References 

Christians of the Second Crusade
Counts of Soissons
12th-century French people